Cassell may refer to:

Companies
 Cassell Military Paperbacks, an imprint of Orion Publishing Group
 Cassell's National Library
 Cassell (publisher) (Cassell Illustrated or Cassell & Co.), a British book publisher now owned by the Orion Publishing Group

People
 Alan Cassell (1932–2017), Australian actor
 Albert Cassell (1895–1969), African American architect
 Alberta Jeannette Cassell (1926–2007), African American architect
 Alphonsus Cassell (1949–2010), calypso and soca musician professionally known as Arrow
 Charles E. Cassell (1842–1916), American architect
 Halima Cassell (born 1975), Pakistani-British sculptor
 Jim Cassell, Youth Academy Director at Manchester City Football Club
 John Cassell (1817–1865), British publisher and businessperson
 Justin Cassell, Montserratian calypsonian
 Justine Cassell (born 1960), American researcher
 Justyn Cassell (born 1967), English rugby player
 Ollan Cassell (born 1937), American athlete
 Paul G. Cassell (born 1959), United States federal judge
 Rob Cassell (born 1983), Australian cricketer
 Sam Cassell (born 1969), American basketball player
 Scott Cassell (born 1960/1), American explorer and underwater filmmaker
 Wally Cassell (1912–2015), American character actor

Places

United States 
 Cassell, Wisconsin, an unincorporated community

Structures
 Cassell Coliseum, basketball arena on Virginia Tech campus

See also
Cassel (disambiguation)
Cassels
Cassells